Big Guns is a British crime television series which originally aired on the BBC in 1958. The show was based on the character of Detective Superintendent Charlesworth, played by Wensley Pithey, who had featured a previous series Mister Charlesworth and would go on to appear further series including Charlesworth at Large and Charlesworth.

Selected cast

Main
 Wensley Pithey Det. Supt. Charlesworth
 Nigel Davenport as Sgt. Spence
 Walter Fitzgerald as  J. Philimore Sparkes
 Anthony Baird as  PC Wrothbury
 Carl Bernard as Milton
 Warren Mitchell as Kegworthy
 Anna Burden as Alice Charlesworth

Guest
 Frank Finlay as Roscoe
 Sam Kydd as Raikes
 Danny Green as  Bronner
 Donald Churchill as Taffy Wilkes
 Wendy Craig as Rita
 Sydney Bromley as Engraver
 Frederick Jaeger as Ni Ni Blascoe
 Leslie Perrins as Cloker
 Anthony Sagar as  Jakey Selsby
 Alfred Lynch as Dancer

References

Bibliography
 Radio Times, Volume 138. G. Newnes, 1958.
 Noble, Peter. British Film and Television Year Book, Volume 9. 1959.

External links
 

BBC television dramas
1958 British television series debuts
1958 British television series endings
1950s British crime television series
English-language television shows